Oliver James Muldoon (born 3 September 1994) is an English professional footballer who plays as a central midfielder for Hornchurch.

Early life
Muldoon was born in Hornchurch, Havering.

Club career
A Charlton Athletic youth graduate, Muldoon signed a new contract with the club on 6 December 2013, running until the end of the 2013–14 season. He was an unused substitute for the matches against Blackburn Rovers and Brighton & Hove Albion in January 2015.

On 11 March 2015, Muldoon agreed a new contract with Charlton, signing until 2017 and being immediately loaned to Gillingham until the end of the season. He made his first-team debut three days later, starting in a 0–0 away draw against Bristol City in League One.

In January 2016, he signed for League Two club Dagenham & Redbridge on loan until the end of the season.

Muldoon was released by Charlton on 1 February 2017. He rejoined Gillingham on 21 February for the remainder of the 2016–17 season, but was released by the club at the end of the season after just four appearances.

On 29 September 2017, Muldoon joined Maidstone United on a contract until the end of the 2017–18 season.

On 18 June 2019, Muldoon signed for Chelmsford City.

On 23 October 2020, Muldoon signed for hometown club Hornchurch.

Career statistics

Honours
Hornchurch
FA Trophy: 2020–21

References

External links
Profile at the Maidstone United F.C. website

1994 births
Living people
Footballers from Hornchurch
English footballers
Association football midfielders
Charlton Athletic F.C. players
Gillingham F.C. players
Dagenham & Redbridge F.C. players
Braintree Town F.C. players
Maidstone United F.C. players
Chelmsford City F.C. players
Hornchurch F.C. players
English Football League players
National League (English football) players